The streaked laughingthrush (Trochalopteron lineatum) is a species of bird in the family Leiothrichidae.  It is commonly found in the northern regions of the Indian subcontinent and some adjoining areas, ranging across Afghanistan, Bhutan, India, Nepal, Pakistan, Russia, and Tajikistan.

The subspecies imbricatum is usually considered a separates species, Bhutan laughingthrush.

Gallery

References

 BirdLife International 2004.  Garrulax lineatus.   2006 IUCN Red List of Threatened Species.   Downloaded on 25 July 2007.

External links
 Streaked laughingthrush videos on the Internet Bird Collection

streaked laughingthrush
Birds of Nepal
Birds of North India
Birds of Pakistan
Birds of Central Asia
streaked laughingthrush
Taxonomy articles created by Polbot